The 78th New York State Legislature, consisting of the New York State Senate and the New York State Assembly, met from January 2 to April 14, 1855, during the first year of Myron H. Clark's governorship, in Albany.

Background
Under the provisions of the New York Constitution of 1846, 32 Senators were elected in single-seat senatorial districts for a two-year term, the whole Senate being renewed biennially. The senatorial districts (except those in New York City) were made up of entire counties. 128 Assemblymen were elected in single-seat districts to a one-year term, the whole Assembly being renewed annually. The Assembly districts were made up of entire towns, or city wards, forming a contiguous area, all in the same county. The City and County of New York was divided into four senatorial districts, and 16 Assembly districts.

At this time there were two major political parties: the Democratic Party and the Whig Party.

The Democratic Party was split into two factions: the Hard-Shells (or Hards) and the Soft-Shells (or Softs). In 1848, the Democratic Party had been split into Barnburners and Hunkers. The Barnburners left the party, and ran as the Free Soil Party, with presidential candidate Martin Van Buren. Afterwards the larger part of the Free Soilers re-joined the Democratic Party. During the following years, the Hunkers split over the question of reconciliation with the Barnburners. The Hards were against it, denying the Barnburners to gain influence in the Party. The Softs favored reconciliation with the intention of maintaining enough strength to win the elections. Both Hards and Softs favored a compromise on the slavery question: to maintain the status quo and to leave the decision to the local population in new Territories or States if they want slavery or not, as expressed in the Kansas-Nebraska Act. The Barnburners were against the permission of slavery in new Territories or States, but were now the minority in the party. The small faction of the Free Soil Party which advocated abolition of slavery, now known as the "Free Democratic Party", endorsed the Whig nominees Clark and Raymnond.

The Whig Party was in the process of disintegrating. The radical anti-slavery Whigs formed the Anti-Nebraska Party, the moderate anti-slavery wing became the Republican Party in other States, but still retained the Whig label in New York. Most of the Whigs which favored a compromise, or preferred to sidestep the issue, joined the Know Nothing movement which ran as the American Party.

About this time the Temperance movement began to enter politics to advocate legal and/or political measures to prohibit the sale of alcoholic beverages, and endorsed candidates of the major parties who favored prohibition. At this election, they endorsed the Whig nominees Clark and Raymond.

Elections
The New York state election, 1854 was held on November 7. Due to the Democratic split, the whole Whig ticket was elected. State Senator Myron H. Clark and New York Times publisher Henry J. Raymond were elected Governor and Lieutenant Governor. Clark defeated the incumbent Gov. Horatio Seymour (Soft) by a plurality of only 309 votes. The approximate party strength at this election, as expressed by the vote on Governor was: Whig/Anti-Nebraska/Temperance/Free Democratic/Anti-Rent fusion 156,800; Soft 156,500; American 122,000, and Hard 34,000.

Sessions
The Legislature met for the regular session at the Old State Capitol in Albany on January 2, 1855; and adjourned on April 14.

DeWitt C. Littlejohn (W) was elected Speaker.

On January 22, Josiah B. Williams (W) was elected president pro tempore of the State Senate.

On February 6, the Legislature re-elected U.S. Senator William H. Seward (W) to a second six-year term, beginning on March 4, 1855.

On March 2, Richard M. Blatchford (W) was elected Speaker pro tempore of the Assembly.

On April 9, the Legislature passed "An Act for the prevention of Intemperance, Pauperism and Crime", thus enacting Prohibition. The law was declared unconstitutional in March 1856 by the New York Court of Appeals, thus repealing Prohibition.

State Senate

Districts

 1st District: Queens, Richmond and Suffolk counties
 2nd District: Kings County
 3rd District: 1st, 2nd, 3rd, 4th, 5th and 6th wards of New York City
 4th District: 7th, 10th, 13th and 17th wards of New York City
 5th District: 8th, 9th and 14th wards of New York City
 6th District: 11th, 12th, 15th, 16th, 18th, 19th, 20th, 21st and 22nd wards of New York City
 7th District: Putnam,  Rockland and Westchester counties
 8th District: Columbia and Dutchess counties
 9th District: Orange and Sullivan counties
 10th District: Greene and Ulster counties
 11th District: Albany and Schenectady counties
 12th District: Rensselaer County
 13th District: Saratoga and Washington counties
 14th District: Clinton, Essex and Warren counties
 15th District: Franklin and St. Lawrence counties
 16th District: Fulton, Hamilton, Herkimer and Montgomery counties
 17th District: Delaware and Schoharie counties
 18th District: Chenango and Otsego counties
 19th District: Oneida County
 20th District: Madison and Oswego counties
 21st District: Jefferson and Lewis counties
 22nd District: Onondaga County
 23rd District: Broome, Cortland and Tioga counties
 24th District: Cayuga and Wayne counties
 25th District: Seneca, Tompkins and Yates counties
 26th District: Chemung and Steuben counties
 27th District: Monroe County
 28th District: Genesee, Niagara and Orleans counties
 29th District: Livingston and Ontario counties
 30th District: Allegany and Wyoming counties
 31st District: Erie County
 32nd District: Cattaraugus and Chautauqua counties

Note: There are now 62 counties in the State of New York. The counties which are not mentioned in this list had not yet been established, or sufficiently organized, the area being included in one or more of the abovementioned counties.

Members
The asterisk (*) denotes members of the previous Legislature who continued in office as members of this Legislature.

Party affiliations follow the vote on U.S. Senator.

Employees
 Clerk: Hugh J. Hastings
 Sergeant-at-Arms: Joseph Garlinghouse
 Assistant Sergeant-at-Arms: Hiram M. Eaton
 Doorkeeper: Samuel R. Tuell
 Assistant Doorkeeper: Almond Becker

State Assembly

Assemblymen
The asterisk (*) denotes members of the previous Legislature who continued as members of this Legislature.

Party affiliations follow the vote on U.S. Senator.

Employees
 Clerk: Richard U. Sherman
 Sergeant-at-Arms: Byron Ellsworth
 Doorkeeper: Harmon Groesbeck
 First Assistant Doorkeeper: Samuel Hall
 Second Assistant Doorkeeper: William Buttro

Notes

Sources
 The New York Civil List compiled by Franklin Benjamin Hough (Weed, Parsons and Co., 1858) [pg. 109 for Senate districts; pg. 137 for senators; pg. 148–157 for Assembly districts; pg. 248ff for assemblymen]
 Journal of the Senate (78th Session) (1855)
 Journal of the Assembly (78th Session) (1855; Vol. 2)

078
1855 in New York (state)
1855 U.S. legislative sessions